Allan R. Millett (born October 22, 1937) is a historian and a retired colonel in U.S. Marine Corps Reserve. He is known for his works on the Korean War, but he has written on other military topics.

Early life
Millett is the son of John D. Millett, who served as the President of Miami University in Ohio, and his wife Catherine.  He has two brothers. He attended DePauw University, graduating in 1959.

Military career
He served as a colonel in the U.S. Marine Corps Reserve.

He is a past president of the Marine Corps Reserve Officers Association (MCROA).

Academic career
He served for 37 years in the history department at Ohio State University.  He currently holds the Stephen E. Ambrose Professorship at the University of New Orleans and is also the director of the university's Eisenhower Center for American Studies.

On television
He has participated in various documentary productions as an expert, including Hold at All Costs: The Story of the Battle of Outpost Harry (2010) and an episode of Greatest Tank Battles (2011).

Publications
Millett has written articles for such publications as International Security, The Americas, Armed Forces & Society, Strategic Review, Journal of Strategic Studies, and Military History Quarterly.

His books include:

 
 
 

with Williamson Murray. Military Innovation in the Interwar Period. Cambridge University Press, 1998.  
 

 A Short History of the Vietnam War. Indiana U. Press, 1985.

Awards

In 2004, Millett was named the recipient of the Samuel Eliot Morison Prize from the Society for Military History for lifetime achievement.  He received the Pritzker Literature Award for Lifetime Achievement in Military Writing from the Pritzker Military Museum & Library in 2008.  Millett has been a Fulbright Distinguished Visiting Professor in Korea and a senior fellow of the Korea Foundation.

From the Marine Corps Heritage Foundation, he has received both the Wallace M. Greene and O.P. Smith awards.

During his career, Millett had directed over fifty doctoral dissertations.  The Society for Military History named its research fellowship award for doctoral students in Millet's honor, The Allan R. Millett Dissertation Research Fellowship Award.

References

External links

Living people
United States Marine Corps officers
American military historians
American male non-fiction writers
Historians of the Korean War
Place of birth missing (living people)
1937 births